The Black Parade Is Dead! is a CD/DVD and live album by American rock band My Chemical Romance. It is the band's second live album, and was released by Reprise Records on July 1, 2008.

Background 
The DVD features My Chemical Romance's final performance as "The Black Parade" from the Palacio de los Deportes in Mexico City, Mexico on October 7, 2007 and as "My Chemical Romance" from Maxwell's in Hoboken, New Jersey, on October 24, 2007. Audio tracks of the Palacio de los Deportes performance are available on the CD, and they can be listened to on the band's official MySpace page. The album peaked at #7 on the Billboard 200, selling 23,000 copies. In November 2008, the RIAA certified the album gold.

Synopsis 
The Black Parade Is Dead! is MCR's final performance as their onstage characters, the Black Parade. The Black Parade centres around a dying character called The Patient, who reflects on events in his life while he is confronted by Death in the form of his fondest memory, that of his father bringing him to see a marching band. This is based on frontman Gerard Way's belief that death comes to a person in the form of their fondest memory. The band is seen in their Black Parade uniforms throughout the performance, and during the first song "The End", Gerard Way is seen taking the role of The Patient, before tearing off his hospital gown to reveal his uniform. Behind the band is the backdrop seen on the video for Welcome to the Black Parade and the poster seen within the Black Parade CD case. On Bob Bryar's drums, the gas mask of the character Mother War can be seen. Way states in the track The Black Parade Is Dead! that the performance in Mexico was the "last performance by The Black Parade forever." The show is decorated with various lights and confetti. Fire is used during the performance of "Mama" and "Famous Last Words". The film ends with a credit sequence featuring the hidden track from The Black Parade, "Blood."

In October 2014, Gerard Way stated that the untitled track on disc two is called "Someone Out There Loves You." This was via a Reddit AMA reported on by Alternative Press.

Promotion 
The album's official website went online on May 5, 2008 and is open for orders of all the limited and standard editions. Once an order is made, the customer gains access to download three free DRM-free tracks: "Dead!", "Mama", "Welcome to the Black Parade". These tracks were recorded from the band's performance at the Palacio de los Deportes and they are on the album itself. Also, to tie in with the finality of the Black Parade's death, the Black Parade website has been changed to a graphic of a flatline. The album was made available for streaming on June 29, before being released on July 1.

Editions 
A limited-edition version with all of the album's contents, a death certificate, and a mask designed by one of the band's members were also available, but are now sold out. This edition is housed in a coffin-shaped box. There are a total of five masks, one designed by each member, but only one is inside the packaging and is selected randomly. The album is also available in explicit and clean editions.

¡Venganza! 

In March 2009, the band made an announcement on their official website that they were releasing the encore set from the Mexico City show, in which they came out with Three Cheers For Sweet Revenge style clothing and the stage set up like the Revenge tour, and played nine songs from the album. It came with a vest, and the videos were put onto a special bullet shaped USB flash drive.

Track listing 
All songs written and composed by My Chemical Romance.

CD and vinyl

DVD

Personnel 
My Chemical Romance as The Black Parade
 Bob Bryar — drums
 Frank Iero — rhythm guitar, backing vocals
 Ray Toro — lead guitar, backing vocals
 Gerard Way — lead vocals
 Mikey Way — bass

Additional musicians
 James Dewees — Synth, keyboards and percussion
 Matt Cortez — acoustic guitar on "The End"

Production
Atom Rothlein – director
Jennifer Destiny Rothlein – producer
Devin Sarno – executive producer
Kelly Norris Sarno – executive producer

Chart positions

Certifications

Release history

References

External links 
Official album page
Official DVD trailer
Official Myspace of the band

My Chemical Romance live albums
My Chemical Romance video albums
The Black Parade (rock opera)
2008 live albums
2008 video albums
Live video albums
Albums recorded at the Palacio de los Deportes